Exercise Orion may refer to:

 A French Armed Forces exercise planned for 2023

 A Portuguese Armed Forces exercise held annually with Spain and the United States 

 A Fire services in the United Kingdom disaster training exercise held in 2010